(died 1592) Iida Yoshitake, a notable retainer of the Mori clan of the Aki Province. Yoshitake and Kodama Narikata both served as commanders of the Mori's naval fleet. During the Battle of Miyajima in the year 1555, Yoshitake participated in the transportation of the main Mori attack force to Miyajima. Along the Buzen and Chikuzen coasts, Yoshitake was also in numerous battles.

Iida Yoshitake
Year of birth unknown